Nora Sun (August 6, 1937 – January 29, 2011) was a Chinese-American diplomat, businesswoman, and daughter of Sun Fo and Rosa Lam/Lan Yi, and granddaughter of Republic of China founder Sun Yat-sen.  She was the founder of the Hong Kong-based Nora Sun Associates and a longtime resident of Shanghai, San Francisco, and Hong Kong.  Chinese-American entrepreneur Yue-Sai Kan called Sun a "Sino-US trade matchmaker".

Timeline

1937: Born in Shanghai, China to Sun Fo and Shanghai property developer and socialite Rosa Lam (Lan Ni in Mandarin).
1946: Kidnapped in Shanghai  After her mother Lan Ni paid the kidnappers' ransom, she and her mother fled to Hong Kong when Mao's troops seized the family's villa.
1955: After graduating from High School, she became the youngest flight attendant to work for Taiwan based Civil Air Transport airline.
1957: Married American pilot and World War II Veteran in Taiwan.  She followed her husband to Thailand, Japan, and Jordan.
1978: Received her Bachelor of Science Degree in Finance from the University of Arizona. She later completed graduate studies at Babson College.
1986: Served as the commercial consul at the United States Consulate General in Guangzhou, China.
1989: Served as the commercial consul at the United States Consulate General in Shanghai, China.
1992: Served as the commercial counselor at the U.S. Embassy, Paris.
1994:  Resigned from the State Department and founded Nora Sun Associates Ltd.
2010: Visited Taipei, Taiwan in order to attend the Taipei International Flora Exposition. Sun was severely injured in a car accident on her way to Taoyuan International Airport on January 1, 2011. She died as a result of the injuries on January 29.

Death
On 1 January 2011, Sun was involved in a traffic collision which caused her serious injury. She was traveling at Jianguo Overpass on the way to Taoyuan International Airport when the car she was riding was hit by another car coming from the opposite side of the highway. The accident injured her chest and abdomen. She was then treated at  but died on 29 January 2011.

Book

See also
Ambassy Club

References

External links
 BBC Profile of Nora Sun
 
  by CNN's Kristie Lu Stout
 Alan Seigrist Profile

1938 births
American people of Chinese descent
2011 deaths
American women diplomats
Chinese emigrants to the United States
Hakka people
University of Arizona alumni
Hong Kong people of Hakka descent
People from Zijin
Taiwanese people of Hakka descent
Politicians from Shanghai
Sun Yat-sen family
Taiwanese people from Guangdong
Road incident deaths in Taiwan
Taiwanese people from Shanghai
Babson College alumni